An auxiliary floating drydock is a type of US Navy floating dry dock. Floating dry docks are able to submerge underwater and to be placed under a ship in need of repair below the water line. Water is then pumped out of the floating dry dock, raising the ship out of the water. The ship becomes blocked on the deck of the floating dry dock for repair. Most floating dry docks have no engine and are towed by tugboats to their destinations. Floating dry docks come in different sizes to accommodate varying ship sizes, while large floating dry docks come in sections and can be combined to increase their size and lift power. Ballast pontoon tanks are flooded with water to submerge or pumped dry to raise the ship.

World War II
At the start of World War II, the US Navy had only three steel auxiliary floating dry docks:

To reduce travel time for repair work, over 150 auxiliary floating dry docks of different sizes were built during World War II between 1942 and 1945. These newly built floating dry docks had a lift capacity of 400 to 100,000 tons. Without these forward repair bases, ships would have had to return to the US for repairs. Between 1 October 1944 and 17 October 1945, 7,000 ships were repaired in auxiliary floating dry docks. After World War II some auxiliary floating dry docks were sold for private use and others were scrapped. In addition to auxiliary floating dry docks, timber floating dry docks were built for use in World War II. Timber floating dry docks had a lift capacity of 400 to 20,000 tons. They were not towed across the open ocean and were not given a US Navy class.

Role
During wartime, ships in continuous use need repair both from wear and from war damage such as from naval mines, kamikaze attacks, dive bombs and torpedoes. Rudders and propellers are best serviced on dry docks. Without remote on-location dry docks, months could be lost if a ship returned to a home port for repair.
Most auxiliary floating drydocks had provisions for the repair crew, including bunk beds, meals, and laundry. Most had power stations, ballast pumps, repair shops, machine shops, and mess halls to be self-sustaining. Some auxiliary floating drydocks also had provisions for the ship under repair, but when possible, the crew of the damaged ship remained on ship while repairs were done. Many had cranes able to lift tons of material and parts to remove damaged parts and to install new parts.

Armament
Most auxiliary floating drydocks had only anti-aircraft guns for defense, as space would not allow for large guns. Typical armaments included 40 mm and 20 mm machine guns. Japanese pilots sometimes mistook empty auxiliary floating drydocks for aircraft carriers.

Large Auxiliary Floating Dry Docks (AFDB)

Auxiliary Floating Docks, Big (AFDB), also known as Advance Base Sectional Docks (ABSD), came in sections, 93 ft long and 3,850 tons each. Each section had a 165-ft beam, a 75-ft molded depth, and 10,000 tons of lifting capacity. Sections could be put together to lift larger ships. AFDB were needed to repair battleships, aircraft carriers, cruisers, and large auxiliary ships. The AFDB-1 Artisan had 10 sections (A to J) for a total lift of 100,000 tons, and was 1,000 ft long with all 10 sections installed. AFDB-1 to 7 were built between 1943 and 1945 and towed to remote navy bases. An AFDB would have a crew of 600 to 1,000 men, a fresh-water distilling plant and was otherwise self-sustaining. They had a rail traveling 15-ton capacity crane with an 85-foot radius and two or more support barges. To pump water from the tanks, there were two 24-in discharge pumps on each section, each pump rated 15,000 gpm. For electricity, there were two 350-kw diesel AC generators on each section, producing 440 volts 3-phase 60-cycle power. AFDBs had steam plants to run the pumps. Each section could store 65,000 gallons of fuel oil to supply the ships under repair. Crew lived in barracks ships, called APL, that docked next to the AFDB.

 USS Artisan (ABSD-1) (A-J), built by Everett-Pacific and others
  (A-J), built by Mare Island Naval Shipyard in Vallejo, California (E, F, H & I in use)
 USS AFDB-3 (A-I), saw fighting action in Guam, and was sold to Croatia in 2000.
  (A-G), built by Mare Island Naval Ship Yard (NSY). Attacked by air on April 27, 1945. Partially sunk 1989 as a reef.
  (A-G), built by Chicago Bridge in Morgan City, Louisiana. Scrapped in 1997.
  (A-G), built by Mare Island NSY. Scrapped 1976.
 USS Los Alamos (AFDB-7) (A-G), built by Chicago Bridge. Sold to a private shipyard in 1995.
Post WW2
 AFDB-8 Machinist, built by Seebeckwerft in Germany. Sold to Guam in 1997.
 AFDB-9 (A-B), built by Sun Shipbuilding in Chester, Pennsylvania. Sold to private owners in Galveston in 1985.

Medium Auxiliary Floating Dry Docks (AFDM)

AFDM are from 6,800 to 8,000 tons and are from 528 to 622 feet long. An AFDM has a crew of 140 to 200 men. An AFDM had a lift capacity 18,000 tons and was armed with two 40 mm and four 20 mm guns. It also had two -ton cranes with 16 ballast tank compartments. AFDMs were built in three pieces, a long center section and two shorter sections, one at each end. All AFDM also had Yard Floating Docks (YFD) class numbers.
 USS AFDM-1 Chicago Bridge, YFD 3. Was floated through the Panama Canal on it side, and scrapped in 1986.
  Alabama DD, YFD 4. Sold to private users in 1999.
 USS AFDM-3 Chicago Bridge, through the Panama Canal on it side to Naval Base Trinidad, YFD 6. Sold to private users.
 USS AFDM-4 Chicago Bridge, YFD 10. Sold to private users in 1948.
 USS Resourceful (AFDM-5) Everett-Pacific, YFD 21. Sold to private users in 1999.
 USS Competent (AFDM-6) Everett-Pacific, YFD 62. Sold to private users in 1997.
 USS Sustain (AFDM-7) Everett-Pacific, YFD 63. Leased to BAE Systems Southeast Shipyards in 1997.
 USS Richland (AFDM-8) Chicago Bridge, YFD 64, scrapped in 2016
 USS AFDM-9 Chicago Bridge, YFD 65. Sold to private users in 1989.
 USS Resolute (AFDM-10) Chicago Bridge, YFD 67. Destroyed in 1947.
 USS AFDM-11 Chicago Bridge, YFD 68. Sold to private users in 2004.
 USS AFDM-12 – Kaiser Shipyards in Vancouver, Washington, YFD 69. Scrapped in 1990.
 USS AFDM-13 – See YFD 70 Columbia Const. in Vancouver, WA. Sold to private users in 1969.
 USS Steadfast (AFDM-14)  Pollock-Stockton in Stockton, California, YFD 71. Sold to private users in 1998.

Medium Auxiliary Repair Docks (ARDM)

Auxiliary repair dock Mobile (ARDM) are 5,200 tons and 489 feet long. ARDs had a ship form hull and lifting capacity of 3,500 tons. ARDMs were used to repair destroyers, submarines, and small auxiliaries. ARDMs had a crew of 130 to 160 men.
 USS Oak Ridge (ARDM-1) by Pacific Bridge Company, Now in US Coast Guard.
 USS Alamogordo (ARDM-2) by Pacific Bridge, Now in Ecuador.
 USS Endurance (ARDM-3) by Pacific Bridge, Now in South America.
Post WW2
 USS Shippingport (ARDM-4) by Bethlehem Steel, US Navy Active.
 USS Arco (ARDM-5) by Todd Pacific Shipyards in Seattle WA, US Navy Active.

Small Auxiliary Floating Dry Docks (AFD - AFDL)
 
Auxiliary Floating Docks, Light (AFDL), also known as Auxiliary Floating Docks (AFD), were 288 ft long, had a beam of 64 ft (20 m), and draft of 3 ft 3 in (0.99 m) empty and 31 ft 4 in (9.55 m) flooded to load a ship. A normal crew was 60 men. AFDL displacement was 1,200 tons and could lift 1,900 tons. AFDL were built as one piece, open at both ends. AFDL were used to repair small craft, PT boats and small submarines. All AFD were reclassified AFDL after the war in 1946.

 USS Endeavor AFD-1/AFDL-1 By Chicago Bridge
 USS AFD-2 By Chicago Bridge
 USS AFD-3/AFDL-3 By Chicago Bridge
 USS AFD-4/AFDL-4 By Chicago Bridge
 USS AFD-5/AFDL-5 By Chicago Bridge
 USS Dynamic (AFD-6)/AFDL-6 By Chicago Bridge
 USS Ability (AFD-7)/AFDL-7 By Chicago Bridge
 USS AFD-8/AFDL-8 By Chicago Bridge
 USS AFD-9/AFDL-9 By Chicago Bridge, stationed at Naval Base Noumea
 USS AFD-10/AFDL-10 By Chicago Bridge
 USS AFD-11/AFDL-11 By Chicago Bridge
 USS AFD-12/AFDL-12
 USS AFD-13/AFDL-13 Typhoon Ida Sank off of Okinawa, Japan on 16 September 1945.
 USS AFD-14/AFDL-14 served Espiritu Santo.
 USS AFD-15/AFDL-15 served at Enewetak Atoll
 USS AFD-16/AFDL-16
 USS AFD-17/AFDL-17 served at Kwajalein Atoll
 USS AFD-18/AFDL-18
 USS AFD-19/AFDL-19 By The Auchter Company served in Dunstaffnage a Scottish village, sold moved to Jacksonville, Florida
 USS AFD-20/AFDL-20 By Auchter Company served American Samoa
 USS AFD-21/AFDL-21 By Auchter Company
 USS AFD-22/AFDL-22 By Auchter Company
 USS Adept (AFD-23)/AFDL-23 Auchter Company
 USS AFD-24/AFDL-24 By Doullot & Ewin in Mobile, Alabama
 USS AFD-25/AFDL-25 By Doullot & Ewin
 USS AFD-26/AFDL-26 By Doullot & Ewin
 USS AFD-27/AFDL-27 By Doullot & Ewin
 USS AFD-28/AFDL-28 By Doullot & Ewin
 USS AFD-29/AFDL – AFDL-29 By Doullot & Ewin
 USS AFD-30/AFDL-30 By Foundation Co. Scrapped in 1979.
 USS AFD-31/AFDL-31 By Foundation Co. Later YFD 83. To US Coast Guard 1947. After war moved to Singapore.
 USS AFD-32/AFDL-32 By Foundation Co.
 USS AFD-33/AFDL-33 By Foundation Co. To Peru 1959 as AFD 106. Active.
 For AFDL-34 to AFDL-46 see: Auxiliary Repair Dock, Concrete

Auxiliary Repair Docks (ARD)

Auxiliary Repair Docks were built by Pacific Bridge Company in Alameda, California. ARD are 483 ft long, have a beam of 71 ft, a draft of 5 ft, and a displacement of 4,800 tons. The crew complement is 6 officers and 125 enlisted. ARD have an armament of two single Oerlikon 20 mm cannons, a bow and are sea worthy. They are self-sustaining with rudders to help in tow moving and have two cranes with a five-ton capacity. ARD also have a stowage barge for extra space. They were used to repair destroyers and submarines. Class 2 could repair Landing Ship, Tank (LST). The stern of the ship is open to allow a ship in need of repair to enter.
  Displacement of 2,200 tons. Built in 1933. Only one in class.
 USS ARD-2 stationed at Naval Base Noumea Sold in 1963.
 USS ARD-3 Sold in 1999.
 USS ARD-4 Sold in 1961.
 ARD-2-class 410 ft long, 49 ft, 4 in wide, ARD-5 to 11:
 USS Waterford (ARD-5)
 USS ARD-6 Sold in 1961.
 USS West Milton (ARD-7) Scrapped in 1992.
 USS ARD-8 Sold in 1961.
  Sold 1977
  Sold, scrapped in 2014
 USS ARD-11 Sold 1977
 ARD-2-class wide: 410 feet long, 49 feet, 4 inches 59 feet, 3 inches wide, ARD 12 to 32:
 USS ARD-12 Sold in 1987.
 USS ARD-13 Sold in 1977.
 USS ARD-14 Sold in 1980.
 USS ARD-15 Sold in 1971.
 USS ARD-16 By Pacific Bridge. Sold and moved to Mobile, AL.
  Sold in 1971.
 USS Endurance ARD-18 ARDM 3. Laid up at Charleston Naval Shipyard.
 USS Oak Ridge ARD-19 ARDM 1. To United States Coast Guard in 2002.
 USS White Sands ARD-20 By Pacific Bridge Co., (changed to AGDS-1). Sold in 1974.
 USS ARD-21 Reserve
 USS Windsor (ARD-22) Sold in 1976
 USS ARD-23 Sold in 1992.
 USS ARD-24 Sold in 1982.
 USS ARD-25 Sold in 1973.
 USS Alamogordo ARD-26 Sold in 2000.
 USS ARD-27 Scrapped in 1974.
 USS ARD-28 Sold and renamed Capitan Rodriguez Zamora.
  Sold to Iran in 1971.
 USS San Onfre (ARD-30) By Pacific Bridge Co.
 USS ARD-31 To US Air Force in 1974.
 USS ARD-32 Sold in 1960.
 USS ARD-33 By Dravo Corp. Renamed AFDL 47 Reliance.

Auxiliary Repair Dock, Concrete (ARDC)

Auxiliary Repair Dock, Concrete were mobile dry docks made of concrete, due to the shortage of steel during World War II. ARDC had a 2,800 ton lifting capacity. ARDC were 389 ft long, 84 ft wide, and 40 ft deep. ARDC has a crew of five officers and 84 enlisted men. Each had a 5-ton crane, with a 42 ft reach. Eight were built at Wilmington, North Carolina, and five at San Pedro in Los Angeles, California.
ARDC 1 – Changed to AFDL-34. Sold to Taiwan in 1959 Han Jih.
ARDC 2 – Changed to AFDL-35. Scrapped in 1974.
ARDC 3 – Changed to AFDL-36. Sold to Taiwan in 1947 Hay Tan. Scuttled in 2000.
ARDC 4 – Changed to AFDL-37. Scrapped in 1981.
ARDC 5 – Changed to AFDL-38. Placed out of service, date unknown. Final Disposition, transferred to San Francisco Maritime National Historical Park and leased to Bay Ship and Yacht shipyard at Alameda, CA.
ARDC 6 – Changed to AFDL-39. Sold to Brazil in 1980 Cidade de Natal.
ARDC 7 – Changed to AFDL-40. Sold to the Philippines in 1990.
ARDC 8 – Changed to AFDL-41. Sold in 1983 to North Florida Shipyard
ARDC 9 – Changed to AFDL-42. Sold to Hurley Marine Works in 1945. Scrapped in 1975.
ARDC 10 – Changed to AFDL-43. Scrapped in 1979.
ARDC 11 – Changed to AFDL-44. Sold to the Philippines in 1969.
ARDC 12 – Changed to AFDL-45. Sold to Todd Seattle 1945. Sold 1981 to Puglia Engineering.
ARDC-13 – Changed to AFDL-46. Destroyed at Bikini in 1946.

Yard Floating Dock (YFD)

Yard Floating Dock (YFD) was used for many types of floating docks, mostly used for harbor or shipyard use. YFDs normally had little-to-no crew space and were serviced from shore. Some auxiliary Repair Docks were converted to YFDs. Types of YFDs were: 400-ton concrete docks, 1,000-ton, 3,000-ton and 5,000-ton wood docks; sectional wood docks from 7,000 to 20,000 tons lifting capacity and a three-piece self docking steel sectional docks with 14,000 to 18,000 tons lifting capacity. All Medium Auxiliary Floating Dry Docks were converted to YFDs after World War II.
 Built in 1905.
USS YFD-2 Built in 1901. Damaged in the attack at Pearl Harbor on 7 December 1941 and then repaired.

 . A medium auxiliary floating dry dock. Retired in 2003.

 USS YFD-3
 USS YFD-4
 USS YFD-5
 USS YFD-6
 USS YFD-7
 USS YFD-8
 USS YFD-9
 USS YFD-10
 USS YFD-11
 USS YFD-12
 USS YFD-13
 USS YFD-14
 USS YFD-15
 USS YFD-16
 USS YFD-17
 USS YFD-18
 USS YFD-19
 USS YFD-20
 USS YFD-21
 USS YFD-22
 USS YFD-23
 USS YFD-24
 USS YFD-25
 USS YFD-26
 USS YFD-27
 USS YFD-28
 USS YFD-29
 USS YFD-30
 USS YFD-31
 USS YFD-32
 USS YFD-33
 USS YFD-34
 USS YFD-35
 USS YFD-36
 USS YFD-37
 USS YFD-38
 USS YFD-39
 USS YFD-40
 USS YFD-41
 USS YFD-42
 USS YFD-43
 USS YFD-44
 USS YFD-45
 USS YFD-46
 USS YFD-47
 USS YFD-48
 USS YFD-49
 USS YFD-50
 USS YFD-51
 USS YFD-52
 USS YFD-53
 USS YFD-54
 USS YFD-55
 USS YFD-56
 USS YFD-57
 USS YFD-58
 USS YFD-59
 USS YFD-60
 USS YFD-61
 USS YFD-62
 USS YFD-63
 USS YFD-64
 USS YFD-65
 USS YFD-66
 USS YFD-67
 USS YFD-68
 USS YFD-69
 USS YFD-70
 USS YFD-71
 USS YFD-72
 USS YFD-73
 USS YFD-74
 USS YFD-75
 USS YFD-76
 USS YFD-77
 USS YFD-78
 USS YFD-79
 USS YFD-80
 USS YFD-81
 USS YFD-82

Image gallery

See also
Dry dock
Heavy-lift ship
Hughes Mining Barge
PD-50 Russia's largest floating dry dock.
Semi-submersible naval vessel
Semi-submersible platform
List of auxiliaries of the United States Navy

References

External links
 – sections a, g, h, i, j, and e
 – section f
 – IX-521 and IX-525
Youtube, BATTLESHIP USS IDAHO REPAIRED AT ESPIRITU SANTO in 1944 in USS Artisan (ABSD-1)1
Youtube, August 15, 1944 mighty battleship Idaho at ABSD-1
Youtube, Floating Dry Docks WWII
US Navy, Beans, Bullets, and Black Oil, The Story of Fleet Logistics Afloat in the Pacific During World War II

Floating drydocks of the United States Navy
Drydocks
Auxiliary ships